Bussy-lès-Daours is a commune in the Somme département in Hauts-de-France in northern France.

Toponymy 
Bussy-lès-Daours has been recorded as:
 Busci in 1153
 Buxeria in 1164
 Buscicum in 1170
 Buxis in 1301
 Buyssi in the 17th century

Geography

Population

See also
Communes of the Somme department

References

Communes of Somme (department)